Josef Čada (March 30, 1881 – December 1, 1959) was a Czech gymnast who competed for Bohemia in the 1908 Summer Olympics and for Czechoslovakia in the 1920 Summer Olympics.  He made his debut in 1907 at the third World Artistic Gymnastics Championships in Prague, winning gold in the individual all-around competition and the team all-around competition.  Čada also competed for Bohemia at 1909, 1911, and 1913 Championships, winning numerous individual and team medals.
  
After World War I, Čada returned to competition and represented Czechoslovakia at the 1920 Antwerp Summer Olympic Games, where he placed 4th in the team all-around competition.  He had previously competed in the 1908 Olympics individual all-around gymnastics competition, placing 25th.

His successes are best seen in the context of the Sokol movement within the former Bohemia and its successor, Czechoslovakia.

References

External links
 
 

1881 births
1959 deaths
Czech male artistic gymnasts
Czechoslovak male artistic gymnasts
Olympic gymnasts of Bohemia
Olympic gymnasts of Czechoslovakia
Gymnasts at the 1908 Summer Olympics
Gymnasts at the 1920 Summer Olympics
Gymnasts from Prague